The Republic of China Air Force Academy (CAFA) is the service academy for the air force of the Republic of China (Taiwan), and is located in Gangshan District, Kaohsiung, Taiwan.

History

Mainland China
The Republic of China Air Force Academy was initially established in 1928 in Nanjing as the Central Army Academy's Aviation Corps, then reorganized as the Central Army Academy's Aviation Class in 1929. In 1931, it was moved from Dajiaochang Airport to Jianqiao Airport in Jianggan, Hangzhou, Zhejiang. A year later in 1932, the name was changed to Central Aviation School. And in 1938, it was finally changed to Air Force Academy. During the War of Resistance-WWII, following the Battle of Shanghai and the Battle of Nanjing, the Air Force Academy was relocated to the Kunming Wujiaba airbase

Taiwan
After the Chinese Civil War in 1949, the academy was stationed in Gangshan, Kaohsiung, Taiwan. In September 1960, the academy was reorganized with a four-year university system.

Academics

Faculties
Education in the academy is divided into two major fields, which are the general field and military field. General field consists of five departments, namely Department of Aeronautics and Astronautics, Department of Avionic Engineering, Department of Aeronautical and Mechanical Engineering, Department of Aviation Management, and Department of Applied Foreign Languages. The military field consists of four categories, namely Basic Theory, Joint Warfare, Military Intelligence and Specialized Knowledge.

Teaching facilities
The academy is equipped with various classrooms and laboratories to support the academic activities. Classrooms in the academy are Aircraft System Models, Astronomy, Joint Warfare, Military Intelligence Analysis and Weapon Introduction. Laboratories in the academy are Flight Simulator, Multimedia Studio and Wind Tunnel Research.

Libraries and digital resources
In 2014, the academy library joined the Taiwan Academic E-book and Database Consortium. As of December 2015, the academy has a collection of 24,700 volumes of e-books.

Student life
The school consists of 12 student clubs, ranging from academic, arts and recreational fields.

Notable alumni
 Feng Shih-kuan, Minister of National Defense (2016–2018)
 Gao Youxin, flying ace of the War of Resistance-World War II
 Hua Hsi-chun, pilot, general, and founder of Taiwan aeronautical industry
 Shen Yi-ming, Chief of the General Staff (2019–2020)
 Tang Fei, Premier (2000)
 Yen Ming, Minister of National Defense (2013 – 2015)
 Yue Yiqin, flying ace of the War of Resistance-World War II

Transport
The academy is accessible West from Gangshan South Station of the Kaohsiung MRT or Gangshan Station of the Taiwan Railways.

See also
 List of universities in Taiwan
 Republic of China Air Force
 Republic of China Air Force Museum
 Republic of China Military Academy
 Republic of China Naval Academy

References

External links

 

1928 establishments in China
1949 establishments in Taiwan
Air force academies
Educational institutions established in 1928
Military academies of Taiwan
Republic of China Air Force
Universities and colleges in Kaohsiung